The Amazing Race 18 (also known as The Amazing Race: Unfinished Business) is the eighteenth season of the American reality television show The Amazing Race. It featured eleven teams of two, each returning from a previous edition of the series, in a race around the world.

The season premiered on CBS on Sunday, February 20, 2011, and the finale aired on May 8, 2011.

Sisters Kisha and Jen Hoffman were the winners of this season, while Herbert "Flight Time" Lang and Nathaniel "Big Easy" Lofton of the Harlem Globetrotters finished in second place, and father and daughter Gary Ervin and Mallory Ervin finished in third.

Production

Development and filming
The Amazing Race 18 was the first season of the United States series to be broadcast on high-definition television. While most other prime-time television shows had transitioned to high definition, including other reality television shows, previous seasons of The Amazing Race used standard-definition television due to the cost and fragility of high-definition recording equipment. 

Filming started on November 20, 2010, at the San Gorgonio Pass wind farm near Palm Springs, California. Teams were spotted at Oceanworld Manly around November 22, 2010, and a day later around the mining town of Broken Hill, New South Wales, in the Australian Outback. Other locales cited as destinations were Yokohama, Japan, where teams swam in freezing waters near Mount Fuji, and the series' first visit to Liechtenstein.

The Express Pass, introduced in the previous season, returned and allowed a team to bypass one single task later in the season. The last team to complete the first task was forced to complete a U-Turn in the next leg, performing both tasks of the leg's Detour. 

The double-length legs format previously used were changed in this season to legs without a mandatory rest period between them. At the end of the first leg in Sydney, Australia, and the fourth leg in Lijiang, China, teams were ordered to keep racing and given their next clue. The first team to check in was still awarded a prize, but the last team to check in was not eliminated and did not have to perform a Speed Bump.

Casting
Phil Keoghan described all the contestants as teams that "came so close to winning but for one reason or another just didn't quite make it over the finish line in first place.” Keoghan gave examples of two teams: Zev & Justin from season 15, who had finished first on a leg, but lost a passport too late to continue racing; and Kisha & Jennifer from season 14, who took an ill-timed restroom break while racing to the pit stop and were eliminated. The prior experience of all the teams in previous seasons allowed the producers to increase the difficulty of the various tasks and challenges. All of the teams were from recent seasons of The Amazing Race with the earliest season being season 12. According to Bertram van Munster, they stayed with more recent teams because "if we're digging too far back, people might not even remember who they were". Season 14 was represented by five of the eleven teams; van Munster called this particular season of The Amazing Race "a very unique season" and justified its larger proportion of teams. Though they had considered mother and son fan-favorites Toni and Dallas Imbimbo from season 13, Keoghan stated they felt the other selected teams "have the best stories and the best motivation" for casting. During an interview with CBS's The Early Show, season 17 runners-up Brook Roberts and Claire Champlin revealed they were asked to take part on the season, but couldn't due to the latter's pregnancy.

Marketing
Snapple served as a sponsor this season of The Amazing Race, with "Snapple Real Facts" introduced during commercial breaks. The sixth leg of the season in Kolkata, India, featured several tasks involving a papaya-and-mango flavored tea Snapple developed and named after the show. Ford also sponsored the season, with their new Focus serving as a prize during the eighth leg.

Cast

This season featured eleven returning teams from previous seasons vying a second chance to win.

The teams cited the following details from their respective races as their reason for having "unfinished business":

From The Amazing Race 12
Kent & Vyxsin: They suffered a communications breakdown in Tuscany due to their lack of experience driving a manual transmission vehicle, resulting in them coming in last on a non-elimination leg and having to complete a Speed Bump on the next leg. They also wasted their U-Turn by erroneously using it on a team who was ahead of them. Note: In season 12, Kent went by the name Kynt.
Ron & Christina: They had a huge lead for most of the final leg in Anchorage until Christina was brought down by the final Roadblock.
From The Amazing Race 14Amanda & Kris: They were U-Turned by Margie & Luke in Siberia.
Jaime & Cara: Their taxi driver in Maui got lost on the way to the final Roadblock destination, costing them valuable time.
Kisha & Jen: They were U-Turned in Beijing. In addition, on the way to the pit stop, Jen took an emergency bathroom break after drinking four bottles of water during the Roadblock, allowing Jaime and Cara to squeak past them to the pit stop. As a result, they came in last place and were eliminated.
Margie & Luke: They were in the lead for most of the final leg in Maui, until Luke stumbled at the final Roadblock, costing them the win.
Mel & Mike: Their taxi driver took them to the wrong place in Phuket, putting them behind all the other teams. They could not recover from this setback and were eliminated.
From The Amazing Race 15Flight Time & Big Easy: Big Easy could not complete the Roadblock in Prague, and took a four-hour penalty, resulting in their elimination.
Zev & Justin: After checking in first in Phnom Penh, they realized they had lost Zev's passport and were unable to find it before all of the other teams checked in.
From The Amazing Race 16Jet & Cord: On the plane from Shanghai to San Francisco, Dan & Jordan were able to move up to first class, giving them a lead that Jet & Cord were never able to overcome.
From The Amazing Race 17Gary & Mallory: They got lost for many hours trying to find the Roadblock location in Oman and ended up losing to Nat & Kat by a mere five minutes.

Future appearances
Margie & Luke, Flight Time & Big Easy, and Jet & Cord returned for a third time to compete on The Amazing Race: All-Stars. Mallory returned on the same season forming a composite team with Mark Jackson when his partner, William "Bopper" Minton, was not medically cleared to compete.

Outside of The Amazing Race, Mallory appeared on the Discovery Channel reality show Backyard Oil in 2013. On May 25, 2016, Flight Time & Big Easy appeared on an Amazing Race-themed primetime special of The Price is Right. Mike White later competed on Survivor: David vs. Goliath. Flight Time & Big Easy also appeared on 100 Day Dream Home in 2021.

Results
The following teams are listed with their placements in each leg. Placements are listed in finishing order.
A  placement with a dagger indicates that the team was eliminated. 
An  placement with a double-dagger indicates that the team was the last to arrive at a pit stop in a non-elimination leg, and had to perform a Speed Bump task in the following leg. 
 An italicized and underlined placement indicates that the team was the last to arrive at a pit stop, but there was no rest period at the pit stop and all teams were instructed to continue racing. There was no required Speed Bump task in the next leg.
 A  indicates that the team used an Express Pass on that leg to bypass one of their tasks.
 A  indicates that the team used the U-Turn and a  indicates the team on the receiving end of the U-Turn.

Notes

Race summary

Leg 1 (United States → Australia)

Episode 1: "Head Down and Hold On" (February 20, 2011)
Prize: The Express Pass (awarded to Gary & Mallory)
Locations
Palm Springs, California (San Gorgonio Pass Wind Farm) (Starting Line)
 Los Angeles → to Sydney, Australia
 Sydney (International Airport Railway Station → City Centre)
 Sydney (City Centre) → Manly
Sydney (Manly – Oceanworld Manly) 
Sydney (Manly – Manly 16ft Skiff Sailing Club)
Sydney (Manly – Shelly Beach) 
Episode summary
At the San Gorgonio Pass Wind Farm, teams had to search through a field containing hundreds of paper airplanes inscribed with various airline names for one matching the clue "Queensland and Northern Territory Aerial Services", which was a reference to Qantas. Once teams presented a Qantas airplane to Phil, he gave them their first clue and tickets for one of two flights to Sydney, Australia. In addition, the last team to complete the task (Amanda & Kris) would be penalized with a U-Turn at the season's first Detour. 
The first eight teams were given tickets on the first Qantas flight and the last three teams received tickets on a flight scheduled to arrive 90 minutes later. However, due to a medical emergency on the first flight, that flight was delayed in Honolulu, Hawaii, allowing the three teams on the second flight to arrive in Sydney first. Once in Sydney, teams had to travel by ferry to Manly, and then make their way to Oceanworld Manly, where they found their next clue.
 In this season's first Roadblock, one team member had to scuba dive into the Oceanworld shark and ray tank and search the floor of the aquarium for a compass. The compass included a guide to decode a message hidden in series of nautical flags outside. Teams had to correctly decode the message and then go to the Manly 16ft Skiff Sailing Club, find the Commodore, and give him the message "I am between the devil and the deep blue sea" in order to receive their next clue.
At the Manly 16ft Skiff Sailing Club, teams had to join a sailing crew and sail a 16ft Skiff along a water course to a series of buoys that held their next clue, which directed them to the pit stop at Shelly Beach.
Additional notes
Graham Keating, Sydney's town crier and the pit stop greeter in leg 8 of season 2, made a cameo appearance in this leg. 
There was no rest period at the pit stop and all teams were instead instructed to continue racing. There was no elimination.

Leg 2 (Australia)

Episode 2: "I Never Looked So Foolish in My Whole Entire Life" (February 27, 2011)
Prize: A trip for two to Cancún, Mexico (awarded to Zev & Justin)
Eliminated: Amanda & Kris
Locations
Sydney (City Centre – Sydney Town Hall (To Sail To Stop Sculpture))
 Sydney → Broken Hill
Broken Hill (The Living Desert)  
Broken Hill (Central Football Club)
Broken Hill (Intersection of Mercury Street & Bismuth Street)
Broken Hill (Junction Mine) 
Episode summary
At the previous pit stop, teams received their clue from Phil, which instructed them to find "To Sail To Stop" and had to figure that this referred to a sculpture of an anchor near Sydney Town Hall. There, teams had to sign up for one of two charter flights leaving the next morning to Broken Hill in the Outback. Once in Broken Hill, teams had to drive themselves to the Living Desert.
 This season's first Detour was a choice between Spirit World or Natural World. In Spirit World, teams had to make a traditional Australian Aboriginal stone mosaic based on a model, and then perform a dance on top of the mosaic before receiving their clue. In Natural World, teams had to make traditional Australian Aboriginal paintings by spraying a mix of water and pigment to create four silhouette images on a piece of slate, after which they received their next clue.
After completing the Detour, teams were instructed to return to Broken Hill and find the "home of the Magpies", which they had to figure out was a reference to the Broken Hill Football League's Central Magpies Australian football stadium: Central Football Club. At the football club, teams dressed up as kangaroos and were given a periodic table with the symbols Hg and Bi highlighted. They had to figure out that these were the symbols for mercury and bismuth, respectively, and that they were also the names of two streets in town that met at an intersection where their next clue was located.
Teams had to check in at the pit stop: Junction Mine in Broken Hill.
Additional notes
 Amanda & Kris had a required U-Turn because they finished last in the starting line task, so they had to complete both sides of the Detour.

Leg 3 (Australia → Japan)

Episode 3: "We Had a Lot of Evil Spirits Apparently" (March 6, 2011)
Prize: A trip for two to Costa Rica (awarded to Zev & Justin)
Eliminated: Mel & Mike
Locations
 Broken Hill → Sydney
Sydney (Central Railway Station) 
 Sydney → Tokyo, Japan
Tokyo (Shibuya – Rotating Parking Garage)
Kamakura (Tsurugaoka Hachimangū – Yabusame Dojo) 
Minamiashigara (Daiyūzan Station – Kintarō Statue)
Minamiashigara (Yuhi Falls  Madarame Farm) 
Yokosuka (Kurihama – Commodore Perry Monument) 
Episode summary
During the pit stop, teams boarded a train that took them back to Sydney, and they began the leg on the train platform at the Central Railway Station. Teams were instructed to fly to Tokyo, Japan. Once in Tokyo, teams had to make their way to the rotating parking garage in Shibuya, where they had to ask the garage attendant for a vehicle before driving themselves to Tsurugaoka Hachimangū, where they found their next clue.
 In this leg's Roadblock, one team member had to dress as a traditional samurai archer and learn a yabusame ritual through observation, consisting of a meditative form ritual before a traditional posing with the yumi bow. Once they performed the first two aspects of the ritual to the dojo master's satisfaction, they had to mount a rotating wooden horse and hit a wooden target with an arrow in order to receive their next clue.
After completing the Roadblock, teams had to travel to the Daiyūzan Station and search the grounds for the Kintarō statue in order to find their next clue.
 This leg's Detour was a choice between Prayer of Purity or Frog of Luck. In Prayer of Purity, teams had to don keikogis and travel to the nearby woods, where they took part in a Shinto cleansing ritual. First, they had to perform a prayer that consisted of a chant, lighting incense, and then shouting while thrusting a bamboo stick out in front of them. Afterward, they had to stand under the Yuhi Falls and endure being drenched in  water for one minute before receiving their next clue. In Frog of Luck, teams had to strip down to their underwear and put on fundoshi before walking to a mud pit, where they had to search for a toy frog in the mud while having mud thrown at them by locals. Once teams found a frog, they had to present it to the nearby master for their next clue.
Teams had to check in at the pit stop: the Commodore Perry Monument in Yokosuka.
Additional notes
Mel & Mike were treated for hypothermia while trying to complete the Detour. They were unable to complete the task and instead went directly to the pit stop for elimination.

Leg 4 (Japan → China)

Episode 4: "This is the Most Stupid Day Ever" (March 13, 2011)
Prize: A trip for two to Aruba (awarded to Margie & Luke)
Locations
Yokosuka (Kurihama – Commodore Perry Monument) 
 Tokyo → Kunming, China
   Kunming → Lijiang
Lijiang (Jade Dragon Mountain)
 Lijiang (Spruce Meadow) 
 Lijiang (Old Town of Lijiang) 
Lijiang (Lion Hill – Eternal Tower) 
Episode summary
At the beginning of this leg, teams were instructed to fly to Lijiang, China. Due to limited flights to Lijiang, all teams had to take a mandatory flight to Kunming. Once in Kunming, teams could travel by either train or plane to Lijiang, where they had to then make their way to Jade Dragon Mountain. There, teams had to properly saddle a yak, which one team member had to ride across a portion of the Baishui River in order to receive their next clue, which instructed teams to ride a gondola up the mountain to Spruce Meadow and search for their next clue.
 In this leg's Roadblock, one team member had to search through tens of thousands of wooden charms for a set of twelve that corresponded to the symbols of the Chinese zodiac. Once they collected the twelve charms, they had to place them on a mobile in the correct order according to Chinese myth in order to receive their next clue.
After completing the Roadblock, teams traveled by charter bus to the Old Town of Lijiang. Once there, teams had to put a wish into a prayer wheel via a slot that corresponded to their sign of the Chinese zodiac and call out the name of their sign in order to receive their next clue.
 This leg's Detour was a choice between Hammer or Horn. In Hammer, teams traveled to a candy shop, where they used wooden mallets to pulverize molten peanut brittle to the right consistency. They then had to cut it into pieces and box them before the candy maker gave them their next clue. In Horn, teams traveled to a square where they had to pick up a large traditional horn and lead a group of Nakhi dancers to Wencheng Palace on the other side of town in order to receive their next clue.
Teams had to check in at the pit stop: the Eternal Tower on Lion Hill in Lijiang. 
Additional notes
Kent & Vyxsin had difficulty finding Narita International Airport in Tokyo, missed the mandatory flight to Kunming, and took a later flight to Kunming.
There was no rest period at the pit stop and all teams were instead instructed to continue racing. There was no elimination.

Leg 5 (China)

Episode 5: "Don't Ruin the Basketball Game" (March 20, 2011)
Prize: 5,000 each (awarded to Jet & Cord)
Eliminated: Jaime & Cara
Locations
 Lijiang → Kunming
Kunming (Dounan Flower Market)
Kunming (Golden Horse and Jade Cock Memorial Archway )
Kunming (Makye Ame Shangri-la Tibetan Palatial Restaurant  China Great Wall Asset Management Company) 
Kunming (Yunnan Province Cultural Center) 
Shilin (Stone Forest) 
Kunming (Green Lake Park) 
Episode summary
At the beginning of this leg, teams were instructed to travel by train to Kunming. Once there, teams had to make their way to the Dounan Flower Market in order to find their next clue, which directed them to the Golden Horse and Jade Cock Memorial Archway.
 This leg's Detour was a choice between Honor the Past or Embrace the Future. In Honor the Past, teams had to do a traditional Tibetan outfit at the Makye Ame Shangri-la Tibetan Palatial Restaurant and then watch a theater troupe. Without taking any notes, teams then had to go offstage and arrange a series of fifteen dolls dressed like the actors in the order of their procession on stage in order to receive their clue. In Embrace the Future, teams had to don safety gear and then carry three heavy boxes up to the roof of the China Great Wall Asset Management Company building. Teams then had to assemble a solar water heating system in order to receive their next clue.
After completing the Detour, teams were only given a photo of their next location and had to figure out that it was the Yunnan Province Cultural Center (referred to in the show as the "Chinese Minority Heritage Center") in order to find their next clue.
 In this leg's Roadblock, one team member had to properly assemble a life-size -long model of a Dilophosaurus in order to receive their next clue. If, at any point, the paleontologist believed that the model was structurally unsafe, the racer had to fix their mistake before they could continue.
Teams had to check in at the pit stop: Green Lake Park in Kunming.
Additional notes
 This leg featured a Double U-Turn. Kent & Vyxsin chose to use the U-Turn on Jaime & Cara, while Jaime & Cara chose to use the U-Turn on Flight Time & Big Easy.
Gary & Mallory used their Express Pass to bypass the Roadblock on this leg.

Leg 6 (China → India)

Episode 6: "I Feel Like a Monkey in a Circus Parade" (March 27, 2011)
Prize: An Indian dinner for two featuring Bollywood-inspired entertainment, and 1,000,000 (US$20,000) (awarded to Gary & Mallory)
Eliminated: Margie & Luke
Locations
Kunming (Green Lake Park) 
Kunming (Jin Fu Yi Zhan Tea Shop)
 Kunming → Kolkata, India
Kolkata (Kolkata Town Hall) 
Kolkata (Jorasanko Thakur Bari – Tiwari Tea Stall)
Kolkata (Rakhal Paul and Sons Statue Shop  Dey's Publishing House & Victoria Institution High School and College) 
Kolkata (Maidan – Fountain of Joy) 
Episode summary
At the beginning of this leg, teams had to travel to the Jin Fu Yi Zhan Tea Shop. There, they took part in a Chinese tea tasting ceremony and were given a taste of a tea that, unbeknownst to them at the time, would be featured in the upcoming Roadblock. Teams were given a brick of tea leaves that would also be needed at the Roadblock along with their next clue, which instructed them to fly to Kolkata, India. Once in Kolkata, teams had to travel to the Kolkata Town Hall, where they found their next clue.
 In this leg's Roadblock, one team member had to take part in an Indian tea tasting ceremony. First, they had to bring a papaya, a mango, and the brick of tea that teams had received earlier to the tea auctioneer. They then had to search among several hundred teacups for one that held the same papaya-and-mango-infused tea that they had tasted in China in order to receive their next clue.
After completing the Roadblock, teams were given a bottle of Snapple and had to figure out that their next clue was printed on the inside of the cap. The clue directed them to go to Jorasanko Thakur Bari in Jorasanko and then search for the Tiwari Tea Stall, where they traded their Snapple bottle for their next clue.
 This leg's Detour was a choice between Hindu Art or Bengali Literature. In Hindu Art, teams had to travel to the Rakhal Paul and Sons Statue Shop and then paint, dress, and adorn a statue of the Hindu god Ganesha in order to receive their next clue. In Bengali Literature, teams had to travel to the Dey's Publishing House and pick up eight bundles of children's books. They then had to direct a rickshaw school bus across town to the Victoria Institution High School and College and deliver the books to the headmistress' office in order to receive their next clue.
Teams had to check in at the pit stop: the Fountain of Joy in Kolkata.

Leg 7 (India)

Episode 7: "You Don't Get Paid Unless You Win" (April 10, 2011)
Prize: A trip for two to Hawaii (awarded to Flight Time & Big Easy)
Eliminated: Ron & Christina
Locations
Kolkata (Maidan – Fountain of Joy) 
 Kolkata → Varanasi
Varanasi (Tonga Stand) 
Varanasi (Tulsi Ghat – Swaminath Akhara)
 Varanasi (Ganges – Sakka Ghat  Ksameshwar Ghat) 
Ramnagar (Ramnagar Fort) 
Episode summary
At the beginning of this leg, teams were instructed to fly to Varanasi. Once there, teams had to find a tonga stand, where they found their next clue.
 In this leg's Roadblock, one team member had to search the streets of Varanasi for six different sadhus depicted in a series of photographs that they had been given. Each one gave them one of six pieces of a phrase described as "the meaning of life": "Once you're over the hill you pick up speed". Once they had all six fragments of the phrase, they had to provide the phrase to a seventh sadhu, who then gave them their next clue.
After completing the Roadblock, teams had to travel to the Swaminath Akhara at Tulsi Ghat, where they had to find a strongman, who gave them their next clue.
 This leg's Detour was a choice between Feed the Fire or Feed the Buffalo. In Feed the Fire, teams traveled down the Ganges to Sakka Ghat, where they had to make fifty traditional fuel patties from water buffalo manure and then slap them against a wall to allow them to dry. When the supervisor was satisfied with their work, teams had to light a stove with dried fuel patties and boil milk for local children before receiving their clue. In Feed the Buffalo, teams had to cross the Ganges, collect two bales of hay, and then return to Ksameshwar Ghat, where they had to deliver the hay to a specific address in order to receive their next clue.
Teams had to check in at the pit stop: the Ramnagar Fort in Ramnagar.

Leg 8 (India → Austria)

Episode 8: "I Cannot Deal With Your Psycho Behavior" (April 17, 2011)
Prize: A 2012 Ford Focus for each racer (awarded to Zev & Justin)
Locations
Ramnagar (Ramnagar Fort) 
 Varanasi → Vienna, Austria
Vienna (Vienna International Airport)
Schollach (Schallaburg Castle)
Vienna (Austrian National Library – Prunksaal)
Vienna (Sigmund Freud Museum & University of Vienna  Wiener Riesenrad) 
Salzburg (Sternbräu Restaurant) 
Salzburg (Aigen – Villa Trapp ) 
Episode summary
At the beginning of this episode, teams were instructed to fly to Vienna, Austria. Once in Vienna, teams went to one of the parking garages at the Vienna International Airport and chose a vehicle, where they received a message from Phil directing them to put the car in reverse to activate the rear-view camera system in order to see their next clue. As they backed up, teams could see the name of their next destination on the pavement behind them: Schloss Schallaburg in Schollach.
At Schallaburg Castle, teams were given a large book with a stamp on the front page with the text – Librarian Prunksaal/Österreichische Nationalbibliothek – directing them to drive to the Austrian National Library and find the librarian in the Prunksaal section, who traded them their next clue in exchange for their book.
 This leg's Detour was a choice between Long Hard Walk or Quick and Easy Meal. In Long Hard Walk, teams made their way to the Sigmund Freud Museum, where they picked up a psychoanalysis couch, which they then had to deliver to the former office of Sigmund Freud at the University of Vienna in order to receive their next clue. In Quick and Easy Meal, teams traveled to the Wiener Riesenrad Ferris wheel, where they picked up two large servings of traditional Austrian cuisine: Wienerschnitzel, Sauerkraut, and Sachertorte. They then boarded one of the dining cars, where they had to finish both servings within one 12-minute revolution of the Ferris wheel before they could receive their next clue.
After completing the Detour, teams had to travel to the Sternbräu Restaurant in Salzburg, where they found their next clue.
 In this leg's Roadblock, one team member had to don a traditional chimney sweep uniform, go onto a roof, and use a weight with wire mesh on a rope to clean one of the chimneys. Once they'd cleaned the chimney three times, they had to go to the basement and open the chimney cleaning door that held their next clue, which directed them to the pit stop: Villa Trapp in Aigen.
Additional notes
This was a non-elimination leg.

Leg 9 (Austria → Liechtenstein → Switzerland)

Episode 9: "We're Good American People" (April 24, 2011)
Prize: A trip for two to Curaçao (awarded to Zev & Justin)
Eliminated: Jet & Cord
Locations
Salzburg (Aigen – Villa Trapp ) 
 Salzburg → Feldkirch
Schaanwald, Liechtenstein (Austria–Liechtenstein Border Crossing)  
Balzers (Gutenberg Castle)
 Balzers → Sargans, Switzerland
 Sargans → Zermatt
Zermatt (Restaurant Walliserkanne Zermatt  Zermatt Railway Station) 
Zermatt (Hinterdorf – Inderbinen-Fountain) 
Zermatt (Bergrestaurant-Moos) 
Episode summary
At the beginning of this leg, teams were instructed to travel by train to Feldkirch and then cross the border to Schaanwald, Liechtenstein, in order to find their next clue.
 For their Speed Bump, Gary & Mallory had to prepare the right mixture of gasoline and oil to power their VéloSoleX motorized bicycle for the Roadblock before they could continue racing.
 In this leg's Roadblock, one team member had to use an odometer to measure the entire length of Liechtenstein by riding from Schaanwald to Balzers on a VéloSoleX. At the Swiss border, they met six-time Winter Olympian Marco Büchel, where they gave him their distance written on the back of a postcard. If they were correct, Büchel directed them to Gutenberg Castle, where they could meet up with their teammate and read the next clue. If they were incorrect, they had to travel back to Schaanwald and start over.
After completing the Roadblock, teams traveled by bus to Sargans, Switzerland, and then by train to Zermatt.
 This leg's Detour was a choice between Cheese or Wheeze. In Cheese, teams traveled to the Restaurant Walliserkanne Zermatt, where they had to finish an entire pot of cheese fondue in order to receive an empty fondue pot with the name of the next location printed on the inside. In Wheeze, teams had to dress as bellhops and then pick up pieces of luggage from the Zermatt railway station. They then had to deliver the suitcases using a luggage cart to different hotels throughout Zermatt where they received receipt tags for each piece of luggage. Once teams had a total of twenty tags from at least five different hotels, they could exchange them for their next clue.
After completing the Detour, teams had to travel by foot to the Inderbinen-Fountain, where they found their next clue directing them to the pit stop: the Bergrestaurant-Moos in Zermatt.
Additional notes
 Flight Time & Big Easy chose to use the U-Turn on Jet & Cord.

Leg 10 (Switzerland)

Episode 10: "Too Many Cooks in the Kitchen" (May 1, 2011)
Prize: A trip for two to the Cook Islands (awarded to Flight Time & Big Easy)
Eliminated: Kent & Vyxsin
Locations
Zermatt (Bergrestaurant-Moos) 
Zermatt (Air Rescue Helicopter Port)
 Swiss Alps (Matterhorn Glacier) 
 Swiss Alps (Matterhorn Glacier) → Riffelalp (Riffelalp Resort)
 Riffelalp → Zermatt
Zermatt (Le Petit Cervin) 
Zermatt (Chalet Gädi – Swiss Cabin) 
Episode summary
At the beginning of this leg, teams had to make their way to the Air Rescue helicopter port, where they had to sign up for a helicopter flight to their next location: the Matterhorn. Before they left on their flight, they received their next clue.
 This leg's Detour was a choice between two mountain rescue tasks: Search or Rescue. In Search, teams used a set of avalanche beacons to search the Matterhorn Glacier for a dummy buried in the snow. They then had to excavate the dummy before they could receive their next clue. In Rescue, teams had to use a special hoisting device to rescue a mountaineer trapped in a crevasse. One team member had to lower their teammate into the crevasse so they could attach a carabiner to the mountaineer. The teammate at the top then had to raise their partner back to the surface and then work together to bring up the rescued mountaineer, who gave them their next clue.
After completing the Detour, teams had to take a helicopter to the Riffelalp ski resort and travel by train back down the mountain to Zermatt in order to find their next clue.
 In this leg's Roadblock, one team member had to make a Travelocity Roaming Gnome out of Swiss chocolate. First, they had to decorate a chocolate mold with colored chocolate. Once it was filled with chocolate, they had to bury it in the snow outside for 30 minutes in order for the chocolate to harden. Once the chocolatier approved their gnome, teams received a real gnome and their next clue. 
Teams had to travel on foot to the pit stop: the Swiss Cabin at Chalet Gädi.

Leg 11 (Switzerland → Brazil)

Episode 11: "This is Where It Ends" (May 8, 2011)
Prize: A cruise for two on the Mediterranean Sea with visits to Rome and Casablanca (awarded to Gary & Mallory)
Eliminated: Zev & Justin
Locations
Zermatt (Zermatt Railway Station) 
 Zermatt → Zürich
 Zürich → Rio de Janeiro, Brazil
 Rio de Janeiro (Carioca Aqueduct)
Rio de Janeiro (Escadaria Selarón)
Rio de Janeiro (Largo de São Francisco de Paula ) 
Rio de Janeiro (Centro de Orientação Profissional Salon)
Rio de Janeiro (Leme Beach – Espaço OX  Copacabana Beach) 
Niterói (Praia de Boa Viagem ) 
Episode summary
At the beginning of this leg, teams were instructed to travel by train to Zürich, and then fly to Rio de Janeiro, Brazil. Once there, teams had to take a tram to the top of the Carioca Aqueduct, where they made their way on foot to Escadaria Selarón. There, they had to search the tile-covered steps for a tile that had their next clue on the back.
 In this leg's Roadblock, one team member had to participate in a Rio Carnival parade. After donning costumes, they had to learn the samba and then lead a parade of dancers. If the Carnival Princess approved their dance, teams received their next clue; if not, they were sent back to relearn the dance and try again.
After completing the Roadblock, teams had to find the Centro de Orientação Profissional Salon, where they had to undergo a Brazilian body waxing session for fifteen minutes before receiving their next clue.
 This season's final Detour was a choice between On the Rocks or On the Beach. In On the Rocks, teams traveled to the Espaço OX bar, where they had to make 100 satisfactory caipirinhas in order to receive their next clue. In On the Beach, teams had to pick up an umbrella loaded with bikinis and a mobile changing station and then sell the bikinis to people on Copacabana Beach. If teams had earned R$100 (roughly $60), they would have received their next clue. Although Zev & Justin tried selling the bikinis, they quickly grew frustrated by their lack of sales and switched to the caipirinhas.
Teams had to check in at the pit stop: the Praia de Boa Viagem, beneath the Niterói Contemporary Art Museum in Niterói.

Leg 12 (Brazil → United States)

Episode 11: "This is Where It Ends" (May 8, 2011)
Winners: Kisha & Jen
Second Place: Flight Time & Big Easy
Third Place: Gary & Mallory
Locations
Niterói (Praia de Boa Viagem ) 
 Rio de Janeiro → Miami, Florida
Miami (Virginia Key – Rickenbacker Marina) 
Key Largo (Jules' Undersea Lodge) 
Big Pine Key (U.S. 1 Mile Marker 29 – Seacamp)
Monroe County (Horseshoe Island)
 Big Pine Key → Marathon (Galway Bay Mobile Home Park)
 Marathon (Old Seven Mile Bridge) → Pigeon Key (Pigeon Key Historic District) 
Episode summary
At the beginning of this leg, teams were instructed to fly to Miami, Florida. Once in Miami, teams had to make their way to the Rickenbacker Marina, where they found their next clue.
 In this leg's first Roadblock, one team member had to learn how to operate a heavy load forklift and move a boat into drydock without dropping it in order to receive their next clue.
After completing the first Roadblock, teams were directed to Jules' Undersea Lodge in Key Largo, where teams found their next clue.
 In this season's final Roadblock, the team member who did not perform the previous Roadblock had to use a submersible to search the lagoon for one of several floating treasure chests that contained their next clue, while surrounded by distracting mermaids, who were swimming around them and playing music.
After completing the second Roadblock, teams were given a riddle instructing them to go to the sea camp near a mile marker on Big Pine Key by "subtract[ing] 4 from 33": Mile Marker 29. There, teams were instructed to walk across a shallow portion of the Gulf of Mexico to Horseshoe Island, where they found their next clue underneath the island's tallest tree. Teams were then instructed to walk back to Big Pine Key, where they took a speedboat to the Galway Bay Mobile Home Park in Marathon.
At Galway Bay, teams had to set up a travel trailer as it appeared in a brochure in order to receive their final clue directing them to the Old Seven Mile Bridge, where they had to ride large tricycles along the bridge to the finish line at the Pigeon Key Historic District on Pigeon Key.
Additional notes
Legs 11 and 12 aired back-to-back as a special two-hour episode.

 Phil's Video Diary 
A new feature to this season is an online show, allowing the viewers to see what happens behind the scenes of The Amazing Race, hosted by Keoghan. This feature replaced the "Elimination Station" videos as seen in previous seasons.

Episode 1: The night before the first leg, Phil prepares to meet the eleven teams at Palm Springs, California. He then films the helicopter shots seen at the start of the episode. While traveling to Sydney, Phil explains that the flight had been delayed, meaning that the Pit Stop crew then only had a small time advantage over the teams. The final portion of the diary shows Phil filming the Pit Stop segment.
Episode 2: Phil films the establishing shot for Shelly Beach and quickly cleans his hair outside, revealing he had not showered before the film crew left Los Angeles. As they drive to Oceanworld Manly to film the Roadblock's establishing shots, Phil sticks his head out of the car window to dry it. Later, Phil explains that they are now flying back to Sydney to catch a flight to Japan, and at the airport, he plays around on the baggage carousel, pretending to be a piece of luggage.
Episode 3: Phil and the production crew arrive in Narita, Japan, and Phil explains why he loves to visit Japan. They head to the Yuhi Falls featured in the "Prayer of Purity" Detour task, enjoying the scenery, before explaining the task to his diary camera and then filming the piece for the show.
Episode 4: The film crew lands in Lijiang, China, and Phil explains the Baishui River crossing tourist attraction before filming the explanation for the "Yak Yak Yak" task. After the group heads to the top of Jade Dragon Mountain, Phil shares some grilled yak with one of the film crew, before the filming of the Roadblock explanation in Spruce Meadow is shown.
Episode 5: The film crew arrives in Kunming and Phil prepares to film the explanation of the "Embrace the Future" Detour task, before poking fun at Barry, the sound technician, and how he has lost his voice. Later, while on the way to the Stone Forest, Barry has his voice back, and they film the Roadblock segment using time-lapse photography. Phil then comments on how the competition has ramped up on Leg 5 and he is interested in who will come in first on the Leg.
Episode 6: Phil and the production team arrive in Kolkata, and Phil remarks at how empty the streets are at 3 o'clock in the morning. By daybreak, the streets are full of cars and people, and Phil remarks on how he loves it when the show goes to India. Phil arrives in Jorasanko to explain the Detour tasks, and then they visit the Victoria Institution School for the end of the "Bengali Literature" Detour task. At the Pit Stop location, Phil plays cricket with several local children until he breaks the bat, and apologizes to them, before filming the establishing shot for the Pit Stop.
Episode 7: In Varanasi, Phil remarks on how busy the city is in the morning, much like Kolkata. Phil walks down towards the Ganges, looking at the vegetable stalls on the way to the river. On the Ganges to film the Detour segments, Phil relaxes and says how he is enjoying traveling on the river. The film crew then heads to Ramnagar Fort to wait at the Pit Stop, where Phil once again enjoys watching the Ganges as the sun sets.
Episode 8: Arriving in Vienna from Delhi, Phil remarks on how different the weather is from India, as it is winter in the northern hemisphere. Phil walks through one of Vienna's Christmas markets before heading to the Austrian National Library where he rides on a horse-drawn carriage before filming the Detour introduction where the Detour choices are initially named "Father of Psychoanalysis" and "Mother of All Meals", before changing to "Long Hard Walk" and "Quick and Easy Meal". The crew then heads to the Sigmund Freud Museum for the Freud's couch Detour before going to the Wiener Riesenrad for the eating Detour, where her eats a serving of Wienerschnitzel, while a microphone is up against the Schnitzel.
Episode 9: The crew arrives in Zermatt, Switzerland, and Phil films the bus they rode and the surroundings. He then walks down the main street to the Detour tasks, commenting on how they only allow electric vehicles in the city. Later, Phil attempts to figure out how the VéloSoleX works, before he rides it in the Liechtenstein Roadblock explanation.
Episode 10: Phil and the film crew leave their hotel early in the morning to head for the helicopter port that will take them onto the glaciers of the Matterhorn to film the Detour segment. They then take a gondola lift back down the mountain to Zermatt.
Episode 11: Phil takes in the view of Rio de Janeiro's Copacabana Beach from his balcony, before heading to the beauty salon where a few crew members are being used to demonstrate the waxing route marker. Later, they head to the Niterói Contemporary Art Museum to prepare for the Pit Stop and film the portion explaining the museum before the next leg begins.

Reception
Critical responseThe Amazing Race 18 received mixed reviews. Scott Von Doviak of The A.V. Club wrote that by the end of the season, it was "finishing (mostly) strong after so many lackluster weeks along the way." Daniel Fienberg of HitFix wrote that "this 'Amazing Race' season was almost conspicuously designed to prevent memorable moments." Luke Dwyer of TV Fanatic wrote that "the start of The Amazing Race: Unfinished Business was chock full of dynamic challenges, interesting legs and surprises. As the number of teams got whittled down, the legs became less creative." Michael Hewitt of the Orange County Register wrote that "the show still has much to recommend it: spectacular locations, engrossing human drama and brilliant editing. But it needs to be a race once again." Patrick Hodges of CinemaBlend wrote that it was "all in all, a very good season. Lots of great locations, lots of sportsmanship, very few assclownish moments." In 2016, this season was ranked 13th out of the first 27 seasons by the Rob Has a Podcast Amazing Race correspondents. Kareem Gantt of Screen Rant wrote that this "the legs are fantastically planned and executed, the suspense was high, and viewers even got some emotional eliminations that made for great TV." In 2021, Jane Andrews of Gossip Cop ranked this season as the show's 7th best season. In 2022, Rhenn Taguiam of Game Rant ranked this season as the sixth-best season.

Ratings
U.S. Nielsen ratings

Episode 2, "I Have Never Looked So Foolish In My Whole Entire Life", aired the same night as the 83rd Academy Awards.
Episode 9, "We're Good American People", aired on Easter Sunday.
Episode 11, "This is Where It Ends", the two-hour season finale, aired on Mother's Day. It was the lowest-rated season finale in the show's history until the season 26 finale.

Canadian ratings
Canadian broadcaster CTV also airs The Amazing Race'' on Sundays at 8 p.m., with only two exceptions: Episode two aired an hour earlier than its normal start time due to CTV's broadcast of the 83rd Academy Awards. Episode six aired an hour earlier due to the said network's broadcast of the 2011 Juno Awards.

References

External links
Official website

 18
2011 American television seasons
Television shows filmed in California
Television shows filmed in Hawaii
Television shows filmed in Australia
Television shows filmed in Hong Kong
Television shows filmed in Japan
Television shows filmed in Yunnan
Television shows filmed in India
Television shows filmed in Austria
Television shows filmed in Liechtenstein
Television shows filmed in Switzerland
Television shows filmed in Brazil
Television shows filmed in Florida